Ealhhelm was an Anglo-Saxon nobleman and ealdorman of central Mercia (now Worcestershire and Gloucestershire) from 940 to 951. His sons were acknowledged as kinsmen by several kings, but the nature of the relationship is unknown.

Ealhhelm is described by the historian Shashi Jayakumar as "an obscure figure who had been ealdorman in Mercia under Edmund". His sons were Ælfhere, Ealdorman of Mercia, Ælfheah, Ælfwine and Eadric. Ælfric Cild may have been his son-in-law.

References

Bibliography

Further reading

 . Retrieved 2007-10-28
 Henson, Donald, A Guide to Late Anglo-Saxon England: From Ælfred to Eadgar II. Hockwold-cum-Wilton: Anglo-Saxon Books, 1998. 
 Williams, Ann, "Princeps Merciorum Gentis: The Family, Career and Connections of Ælfhere, Ealdorman of Mercia" in Peter Clemoes (ed.), Anglo-Saxon England, 10 (1982), pp. 143–172. Cambridge University Press, 2007. 

Anglo-Saxon ealdormen
10th-century English people